This list of mammals in Pennsylvania consists of 66 species currently believed to occur wild in the state. This excludes feral domesticated species.

Several species recently lived wild in Pennsylvania, but are now extirpated (locally, but not globally, extinct). They are the marsh rice rat (Oryzomys palustris), eastern wolf (Canis lycaon), American marten (Martes americana), wolverine (Gulo gulo), cougar (Puma concolor),  Canada lynx (Lynx canadensis), moose (Alces alces), and bison (Bison bison).

Opossums
Order: Didelphimorphia

Family: Didelphidae

One species of opossum occurs in Pennsylvania.

Shrews and moles
Order: Eulipotyphla

Family: Soricidae

Seven species of shrews live in Pennsylvania.

Family: Talpidae

Three species of moles occur in Pennsylvania.

Bats
Order: Chiroptera

Family: Vespertilionidae

Eleven species of evening bats occur in Pennsylvania.

Rabbits and hares
Order: Lagomorpha

Family: Leporidae

Three species of rabbits and hares occur in Pennsylvania.

Rodents

Order: Rodentia

Family: Castoridae

One species of beaver occurs in Pennsylvania.

Family: Myocastoridae

One species of porcupine occurs in Pennsylvania.

Family: Dipodidae

Two species of jumping mice occur in Pennsylvania.

Family: Cricetidae

Nine species of voles and New World rats and mice occur in Pennsylvania.

Subfamily Arvicolinae (lemmings, voles, and muskrats)

Subfamily Neotominae (North American rats and mice)

Family: Muridae

Three species of Old World rats and mice occur in Pennsylvania.

Family: Sciuridae

Eight species of squirrels, chipmunks, and marmots occur in Pennsylvania.

Subfamily Sciurinae (tree squirrels and flying squirrels)

Subfamily Xerinae (chipmunks and ground squirrels)

Carnivorans
Order: Carnivora

Family: Felidae

One species of cat occurs in Pennsylvania.

Family: Canidae

Three species of canids occur in Pennsylvania.

Family: Ursidae

One species of bear occurs in Pennsylvania.

Family: Mephitidae

Two species of skunks occur in Pennsylvania.

Family: Mustelidae

Seven species of mustelids occur in Pennsylvania.

Family: Procyonidae

One species of raccoons occurs in Pennsylvania.

Hoofed mammals

Order: Artiodactyla

Family: Cervidae

Two species of deer and elk occur in Pennsylvania.

References

 
 

Pennsylvania
Natural history of Pennsylvania
Mammals